The large electrostatic generator (Dutch: Van Marum electriseermachine) is a large handcrafted electromechanical instrument designed by Martin van Marum and built by John Cuthbertson in 1784 for the Teylers Museum in Haarlem, where it forms the centerpiece of the instrument room. The concept of an electrostatic generator was new, and the battery (array) of leiden jars was the largest ever built (only one of the 4 sets of leiden jars is on display to conserve space). The two glass disks of the triboelectric generator (friction generator) are 1.65 meters in diameter, and the machine is capable of generating a potential of 330,000 volts.

History

The device is a larger version of a similar model built in Groningen by Gerhard Kuyper in 1774 for physics student Martin van Marum, who used it to make a name for himself in the study of electricity with his lectures and demonstrations.

It was Van Marum's dream to create a larger version, and he applied to the Teylers Stichting in 1783 for funding to create such a large instrument in the hope that it would add a valuable contribution to the science of electricity. On April 11 of that year his request was granted, and on May 7 Cuthbertson was employed who finished the device a year later and it was proudly installed on Christmas Eve. The machine performed above expectations and was only modified a few times to prevent leaks of the static charge. The study of electricity leakage led to many insights in the study of electricity. The machine was last modified in 1791. For the friction, cushions were used as an improvement over the mercury bath used in the earlier model. For a complete description of the electrostatic generator, an explanation was produced in 1868 by the Parisian author Adolphe Ganot (1804-1887).

Van Marum himself became curator of the physics cabinet at Teylers in the same year the instrument was ordered to be made. He used it again and again in laboratory lectures to the public and continued to make excursions with his smaller model, which he finally sold to the museum for 120 guilders in 1790.

References

 "Tot de vonken eraf vliegen : statische elektriciteit in beweging van Teyler toen tot TNO nu", G.A. van de Schootbrugge, TNO, 1985, 

Teylers Museum
Electrical generators
Electrostatics
Historical scientific instruments
18th-century architecture in the Netherlands